The 8th Legislative Assembly of Ontario was in session from June 26, 1894, until January 28, 1898, just prior to the 1898 general election. The majority party was the Ontario Liberal Party  led by Oliver Mowat. Arthur Sturgis Hardy succeeded Mowat as Premier in 1896 after Mowat entered federal politics. The Assembly also had significant groupings from the Patrons of Industry (representing farmers' interests) and the Protestant Protective Association (representing anti-Catholic sentiment, and associated with the Orange Order), each of which returned candidates either on their own or with local Liberal or Conservative support.

William Douglas Balfour served as Speaker for the assembly until he was named to cabinet on July 14, 1896.  Alfred Évanturel succeeded him as Speaker.

Members elected to the Assembly

Timeline

External links 
A History of Ontario : its resources and development., Alexander Fraser
Members in Parliament 8

References 

08
1894 establishments in Ontario
1898 disestablishments in Ontario